Ralph Hall was one of two Members of the Parliament of England for the constituency of York between 1562 and 1571 and then again in another session in 1571.

Life and politics
Ralph was the second son of William Hall and Elizabeth Dyneley. He married Isabel Gale, son of Alderman George Gale, who was also an MP for the city of York. 

He was made a freeman of the city in 1532 and became a member of the guild of Merchant Adventureres in 1532. He held several offices for the city, including chamberlain (1538–39), sheriff (1553–54), alderman (1556 and two terms as Lord Mayor (1558–59 and 1576–77). Not much has been recorded of his life. Ralph died in 1577.

References

Members of the Parliament of England for constituencies in Yorkshire
English MPs 1563–1567
English MPs 1571

1577 deaths
Year of birth missing